Riniki Bhuyan Sharma is an Indian business woman from Assam. She is the managing director of Pride East Entertainment, a media house. She is married to Himanta Biswa Sarma, Chief Minister of Assam.

Early life
Riniki was born and grew up in Guwahati to a well-known industrialist of that time Jadav Chandra Bhuyan.

She studied in St. Mary's High School, Guwahati and then joined Cotton College and graduated in political science. She then pursued LLB from Govt. Law College of Guwahati.

She married Himanta Biswa Sarma, whom she met in Cotton College.

She has two children, Nandil Biswa Sarma and Sukanya Sarma.

Career
Riniki is the Chairman of her media house and holding company Pride East Entertainments, which is a parent company of several channels. It includes, two news channels (News Live & Northeast East Live), three entertainment channels (Ramdhenu, Rang & Indradhanu) and one Assamese News paper (Niyamiya Barta).

Awards
Riniki Bhuyan Sharma won the Prag Prerona Award in March 2020 given by Prag News.

References

Living people
Cotton College, Guwahati alumni
People from Assam
People from Guwahati
Year of birth missing (living people)